Major crimes may refer to:

 A major crime

In justice & law
 List of major crimes in Singapore
 List of major crimes in the United Kingdom
 Major case squad (major crimes unit), a division within some police departments
 Major Crimes Act, by the U.S. Congress in 1885

Other
 Major Crimes (TV series), an American drama television series